Archibald Stewart (27 September 1890 – 18 September 1974) was a Scotland international rugby union footballer. He played as a Forward.

Rugby Union career

Amateur career

Stewart played for Edinburgh Academicals.

Provincial career

Stewart played in the inter-City match between Glasgow District and Edinburgh District on 3 December 1910. Edinburgh ran out victors with a 26 - 5 scoreline.

International career

Stewart was capped for Scotland only the once, in 1914.

Military career

He signed up to the RAMC in the First World War in 1915. He served as a captain.

Medical career

He later studied to be a doctor at the University of Edinburgh.

References

1890 births
1974 deaths
Scottish rugby union players
Scotland international rugby union players
Edinburgh District (rugby union) players
Rugby union players from Leith
Edinburgh Academicals rugby union players
British Army personnel of World War I
Royal Army Medical Corps officers
Rugby union forwards